Hugo Eyre Bernat (born 7 May 1994) is a Spanish footballer who plays as a goalkeeper.

Club career
Born in Barcelona, Catalonia, Hugo finished his graduation with CF Damm. In August 2013 he moved to FC Santboià, and made his debuts as a senior with the side during the campaign, in Tercera División.

In the 2014 summer, Hugo moved to Albacete Balompié, being initially assigned to the reserves also in the fourth tier. On 19 September 2015 he made his first team debut, coming on as a first-half substitute for field player Mario Ortiz in a 1–1 away draw against CD Mirandés, after Héctor Pizana was sent off; he also saved a penalty during the match.

On 28 December 2017, Hugo terminated his contract with Alba.

References

External links

1994 births
Living people
Footballers from Barcelona
Spanish footballers
Association football goalkeepers
Segunda División players
Tercera División players
CF Badalona players
Atlético Albacete players
Albacete Balompié players
CF Damm players
FC Santboià players